The knockout stage of the 2001–02 UEFA Champions League began on 2 April 2002 and ended on 15 May 2002 with the final at Hampden Park in Glasgow, Scotland. Teams qualified via the 2001–02 UEFA Champions League second group stage.

All times Central European Summer Time (UTC+2)

Bracket

Quarter-finals
The first legs were played on 2 and 3 April, and the second legs were played on 9 and 10 April 2002.

|}

First leg

Second leg

Barcelona won 3–2 on aggregate.

Bayer Leverkusen won 4–3 on aggregate.

Manchester United won 5–2 on aggregate.

Real Madrid won 3–2 on aggregate.

Semi-finals
The first legs were played on 23 and 24 April, and the second legs were played on 30 April and 1 May 2002.

|}

First leg

Second leg

3–3 on aggregate; Bayer Leverkusen won on away goals.

Real Madrid won 3–1 on aggregate.

Final

External links
2001–02 UEFA Champions League, UEFA.com

Knockout Stage
2001-02